Ron Jeremy is a former American pornographic film actor, actor, filmmaker, businessman, television personality and stand-up comedian.

Pornographic films

Non-pornographic films

Television

Video games
 2003 Celebrity Deathmatch as himself, Playable Character
 2004 Leisure Suit Larry: Magna Cum Laude 
 2011 Postal III as himself, Porn Store Owner
 2019 Bad Ass Babes as himself

Videos
 A series of viral video spoofs for video sharing website Heavy.com. The videos lampooned include Britney Spears, lonelygirl15, Little Superstar and others.
 "The Plot to Bomb the Panhandle" video, by the band A Day to Remember.
 An episode of Gorgeous Tiny Chicken Machine Show, in which was entitled "Pamous Movie Star".
 Music video "10 Miles Wide"
 Break.com video Tron Jeremy, a parody of the film Tron: Legacy. In October 2013, Jeremy appeared in Bart Baker's parody of Miley Cyrus's "Wrecking Ball".
 3 cameo appearances in LMFAO's "Sexy and I Know It" video as himself in a black shirt with leopard print writing with "Sexy and I know it" on it.
 "Casual Sex" music video by My Darkest Days.
 Music video "Christina Linhardt's Habanera with Ron Jeremy and Friends"
 Short film "Bad Ass Babes"
 2 cameo appearances in Sublime's  "Date Rape" as a judge and inmate

Web series
 2009 Star-ving as himself

Documentary films
 2001 Porn Star: The Legend of Ron Jeremy as himself
 2005 Fuck: A Fuckumentary as himself
 2019 The Rainbow as himself
 2022 Porn King: The Rise & Fall of Ron Jeremy as himself

Notes

References

External links
 Ron Jeremy filmography on IMDb

Male actor filmographies
American filmographies